Shuwa may mean
Shuwa Arabic, the Afro-Arabic language spoken in Sudan, Chad and other states of Sahelian Africa
The mostly Arab speakers of this language also known as Baggara
The Japanese Sign Language (手話) 
Honinbo Shuwa, a Japanese professional go player
Shuwaa, a roasted goat or lamb dish popular in Oman and the UAE